
Gmina Murów, (German: Gemeinde Murow) is a rural gmina (administrative district) in Opole County, Opole Voivodeship, in south-western Poland.

Since 2009 the commune, like much of the region, has been bilingual in German and Polish.

The gmina contains part of the protected area called Stobrawa Landscape Park.

Villages
The commune contains the villages and settlements of:

Murów
Bożejów
Bukowo
Czarna Woda
Dębiniec
Grabczok
Grabice
Kały
Kęszyce
Mańczok
Młodnik
Morcinek
Nowe Budkowice
Okoły
Radomierowice
Stare Budkowice
Święciny
Wojszyn
Zagwiździe

Neighbouring gminas
Gmina Murów is bordered by the gminas of Dobrzeń Wielki, Kluczbork, Lasowice Wielkie, Łubniany, Pokój and Wołczyn.

Twin towns – sister cities

Gmina Murów is twinned with:
 Vallendar, Germany

References

Murow
Opole County
Bilingual communes in Poland